Cauto may refer to:

Places
Río Cauto:
Cauto River, the longest river in Cuba
Río Cauto, Cuba, a municipality in Granma Province, Cuba
Cauto Cristo, Cuba, a municipality in Granma Province, Cuba

Ships
USS Cauto (ID-1538), a United States Navy cargo ship in commission from 1918 to 1919